Calliostoma vinosum is a species of sea snail, a marine gastropod mollusk in the family Calliostomatidae.

Description
The size of the shell varies between 13 mm and 37 mm.

Distribution
This species occurs in the Atlantic Ocean off Brazil at depths between 22 m and 103 m.

References

 Quinn, J. F., Jr. 1992. New species of Calliostoma Swainson, 1840 (Gastropoda: Trochidae), and notes on some poorly known species from the Western Atlantic Ocean. Nautilus 106: 77-114.

External links
 To Biodiversity Heritage Library (1 publication)
 To Encyclopedia of Life
 To USNM Invertebrate Zoology Mollusca Collection
 To World Register of Marine Species

vinosum
Gastropods described in 1992